The Colorado Tribune, also known as Daily and Weekly Colorado Tribune, was a newspaper published in Denver, Colorado from 15 May 1867 to 19 January 1871. It was the successor to the Denver Daily, published from 5 February to 14 May 1867, and it was succeeded by the Denver Daily Tribune, which continued through a series of name changes, eventually becoming the Denver Republican, which merged in 1913 with the Rocky Mountain News. An 1868 advertisement claimed the Daily Colorado Tribune was "the largest daily newspaper published between the Missouri River and California."

References

Newspapers published in Colorado
Defunct newspapers published in Colorado